The Ministry of Labour and Social Protection of the Population might refer to:

Ministry of Labour and Social Protection of the Population (Azerbaijan)
Ministry of Labour and Social Protection of the Population (Kazakhstan)